Tamanak or Tomanak, also rendered as Tumanak, may refer to:
 Tamanak-e Olya, Boyer-Ahmad
 Tamanak-e Sofla, Boyer-Ahmad
 Tomanak-e Olya, Dana
 Tomanak-e Sofla, Dana